Criss Cross is a 1949 American film noir crime film directed by Robert Siodmak and starring Burt Lancaster, Yvonne De Carlo and Dan Duryea, from Don Tracy's novel of the same name. This black-and-white film was shot partly on location in the Bunker Hill section of Los Angeles. The film was written by Daniel Fuchs. Miklós Rózsa scored the film's soundtrack. It was remade as The Underneath in 1995.

Plot
Steve Thompson returns to Los Angeles looking for his ex-wife Anna Dundee, eager to rekindle a new romance with her against all better judgment. He resumes his old job as a driver at an armored-truck company.

Anna is married to mobster Slim Dundee, but continues an auspicious affair with Thompson.  To deflect any hint of their affair, Thompson leads Dundee into a daylight armored-truck robbery caper, only to double cross him when the crime is pulled off. Wounded during the botched robbery, Thompson is recovering in a hospital and considered the hero who wounded the robbers. Dundee has sent a man to the hospital to bring Thompson to him, but Thompson bribes the man to drive him to Anna's hiding place, where they're to meet and start a new life with the stolen money. But seeing Thompson's wounded condition Anna shocks Thompson with her "criss cross" by telling him that she will take the money and leave him behind. Thompson is trying to reason with Anna when Dundee arrives. He assumed Thompson would bribe the driver and followed them. He kills both Anna and Thompson, but as he turns to leave, sirens fill the air.

Cast
 Burt Lancaster as Steve Thompson
 Yvonne De Carlo as Anna
 Dan Duryea as Slim Dundee
 Stephen McNally as Det. Lt. Pete Ramirez
 Esy Morales as Orchestra Leader
 Tom Pedi as Vincent
 Percy Helton as Frank
 Alan Napier as Finchley
 Robert Osterloh as Mr. Nelson
 Griff Barnett as Pop
 Meg Randall as Helen
 Richard Long as Slade Thompson
 Joan Miller as The Lush
 Edna Holland as Mrs. Thompson  
 John Doucette as Walt
 Marc Krah as Mort
 James O'Rear as Waxie
 John 'Skins' Miller as Midget (as John Skins Miller)
 Tony Curtis appears for a few seconds dancing with Yvonne de Carlo

Production notes
Criss Cross features the screen debut of Tony Curtis (then known as Anthony Curtis), who briefly appears as an extra in a key scene at the Round-Up Bar dancing with De Carlo to "Jungle Fantasy" performed by Esy Morales and his Rhumba Band.

The production nearly derailed when producer Mark Hellinger died suddenly before filming began. Reportedly, Lancaster was unhappy with the way Siodmak and Fuchs had reworked Hellinger's idea of a racetrack heist into a fatal romantic triangle.

Locations
Criss Cross was shot around downtown Los Angeles, beginning with an aerial panorama that ends at a nightclub just north of downtown. Lancaster's character lives with his mother at a house on Hill Street, just above the north entrance of the short Hill Street Tunnel at Temple Street in the Court Hill section of Bunker Hill. The tunnel and the hill above it (including the house) were razed in 1955 for expansion of the Civic Center and a new Los Angeles County Courthouse on Hill Street, which can often be seen in episodes of Perry Mason. For the planning of the heist, Siodmak used the exterior and interiors of the rambling, rundown Sunshine Apartments on the steep Third Street steps between Hill and Olive, just opposite the Angels Flight funicular, seen in the background through the windows of the hotel room. This area of Bunker Hill was a favorite of noir directors, and unfortunately it was all torn down in the 1960s. There is also an extended scene inside and outside Union Station on Alameda.

Reception

Critical response
When released, The New York Times gave the film a mixed review, writing, "A tough, mildly exciting melodrama about gangsters and a dame named Anna who 'gets into the blood' of a guy named Steve and causes him no end of trouble...In many ways Criss Cross is a suspenseful action picture, due to the resourceful directing of Robert Siodmak. But it also is tedious and plodding at times, due partly to Mr. Siodmak's indulgence of a script that is verbose, redundant and imitative. However, the writers should be credited with having invested the old triangle-gangster formula with a couple of fresh if not exactly revolutionary twists."

The film was reissued by Universal-International in 1959.

Reappraisal
In 2004, film critic Dennis Schwartz wrote, "Robert Siodmak ... directs this cynical film noir of obsessive love and betrayal. It's 1940s film noir at its most influential as far as style goes, that is further enhanced by the beautiful dark photography of Frank Planer, the tight script by Daniel Fuchs, and the taut pacing by Siodmak. It's based on a story by Don Tracy ... Siodmak keeps the suspense at a feverish pitch, and the characterizations are well drawn out. Criss Cross is one of the great examples of 1940s film noir at its most tragic. A must see film for fans of the genre."

Dave Kehr, film critic for the Chicago Reader, lauded the film and wrote, "Robert Siodmak was one of the most influential stylists of the 40s, helping to create, in films such as Phantom Lady and The Killers, the characteristic look of American film noir. But most of his films have nothing more than their pictorial qualities to recommend them—Criss Cross being one of the few exceptions, an archly noir story replete with triple and quadruple crosses, leading up to one of the most shockingly cynical endings in the whole genre."

Film Noir Foundation founder Eddie Muller lists Criss Cross as No. 2 in his Top 25 Noir Films saying: "Stupidly, I used to think there was something missing at the core. But it keeps getting better every time I see it. De Carlo in the parking lot pleading straight to the camera might be noir's defining moment."

On the review aggregator website Rotten Tomatoes, 92% of critics gave the film a positive review, based on 12 reviews.

Awards
Nomination
 Edgar Allan Poe Awards: Edgar, Best Motion Picture, Daniel Fuchs and Don Tracy (novel); 1950.

Adaptation
The film was remade as The Underneath directed by Steven Soderbergh in 1995.

References

External links

 
 
 
 
 
 
 

1949 films
1949 crime drama films
American black-and-white films
American crime drama films
American heist films
1940s English-language films
Film noir
Films based on American novels
Films directed by Robert Siodmak
Universal Pictures films
Films scored by Miklós Rózsa
Films set in Los Angeles
1940s American films